Africana are materials such as books, documents, artifacts, or artistic or literary works of any of the nations of Africa which reflect on the geographical, historical, or cultural development of Africa.

Even though it can include material relating to any region in Africa, it is usually focused on Southern African history.

Notable Africana collections 
 Brenthurst Library
 MuseuMAfricA
 Duggan-Cronin Gallery

References

Bibliography 

 Ensiklopedie van die wêreld, deel 1. Stellenbosch: Albertyn, 1992. ISBN 0-949948-18-7
 
 
 
 Standard Encyclopaedia of Southern Africa, part 1. Cape Town: Nasou, 1970.
 

African culture
Historiography of Africa